The 1963 Stanford Indians football team represented Stanford University in the 1963 NCAA University Division football season. The team was led by new head coach John Ralston. Ralston succeeded Jack Curtice, who had been fired at the end of the previous season. The team played their home games at Stanford Stadium in Stanford, California.

Schedule

Roster

Game summaries

California

    
    
    
    
    
    
    
    
    

The 66th Big Game was scheduled for November 23, but after the assassination of John F. Kennedy, like nearly all sporting events, the game was canceled and rescheduled for the following week. Stanford was winless in the conference coming into the game, and following a California punt return for a touchdown, were behind their rival 17–9 late in the second half. But the Indians fought back, scoring the last 19 points in the game on two touchdowns and two field goals to win the game.

Players drafted by the NFL/AFL

References

Stanford
Stanford Cardinal football seasons
Stanford Indians football